XMLTV is an XML based file format for describing TV listings, which has been introduced in 2002. IPTV providers use XMLTV as the base reference template in their systems, and extend it internally according to their business needs.

See also 

MythTV

References

External links
 XMLTV home page
 XMLTV project page at SourceForge.net
 XMLTV related projects (viewers, grabbers)
 Television Listings and XMLTV article at xml.com
 Brazilian XMLTV 

XML markup languages